Myrmecophila brysiana is an orchid in the genus Myrmecophila. A common name for the species is Brys's schomburgkia. It was first described by Charles Antoine Lemaire in 1851.

It is found growing along rivers and seashores in dense mangroves in Central America (Belize, Costa Rica, Guatemala, Honduras, southeast Mexico and the southwest Caribbean). The flowers show significant variation and may indicate this is more than one species.

References

Taxa named by Charles Antoine Lemaire
Orchids of Central America
Orchids of Belize
Flora of Honduras
Flora of Mexico
Flora of Costa Rica
Flora of Guatemala
Flora of Belize
Flora of the Caribbean
Laeliinae
Flora without expected TNC conservation status